Wade Ray (April 13, 1913 in Evansville, Indiana – November 11, 1998 in Sparta, IL) was an American Western Swing fiddler and vocalist. His bands, the Wade Ray Five, Wade Ray And His Ozark Mountain Boys, etc., included musicians such as Kenneth Carllile and Curly Chalker. He retired to Sparta, Illinois in 1979 where he died in 1998.

Discography
Singles
"Are You Fer It?" B "Walk Softly", Wade Ray And His Ozark Mountain Boys 1951
Let Me Go, Devil, first recorded on July 2, 1953 by Wade Ray, followed a few weeks later by Georgie Shaw, Johnny Bond and Tex Ritter
"Wild Heart", written by Cindy Walker, B "Little Green Valley" RCA Victor 1957
 "Idaho Red", the first 'trucker song', 1953
Appearances on other artists' recordings
Country Favorites-Willie Nelson Style
The Gordons (duo)
Kenneth C. "Jethro" Burns The RCA Camden LP
Make Way for Willie Nelson

References

External links
 Wade Ray deserved better by Rich Kienzle

1913 births
1998 deaths
20th-century American musicians
People from Posey County, Indiana
People from Sparta, Illinois